Karl Edward Swanson (December 17, 1900 – April 3, 2002) was a second baseman in Major League Baseball during parts of two seasons (1928 and 1929) for the Chicago White Sox.

Baseball career
Born in North Henderson, Illinois in 1900, Swanson's first pro team was the 1923 Cedar Rapids Bunnies of the Mississippi Valley League, a Class D circuit where he played for the first six seasons of his career. Swanson's breakout year was 1928, when he batted .384 (third-highest in the league); in August, he was signed by the White Sox and installed as the club's second baseman. Although solid defensively, Swanson was baffled by big-league pitching and could only manage nine hits (eight singles and a double) in 65 at-bats, for a .138 average. (Swanson was also married that year, on June 16, to Lucille.) After a strong spring training in 1929, however, Swanson came north with the Sox but was used only sparingly, pinch hitting in two games before being returned to the minors in early May. Swanson knocked around the minors for several more years before ending up in the same place he began: with the Cedar Rapids Raiders of the Western League, in 1935.

Swanson was the only major league player to live through the entire 20th century, being born in the 19th century and dying in the 21st – Negro league pitcher Silas Simmons is the only other professional athlete with this distinction, dying at the age of 111 in 2006. At the time of his death, Swanson was the oldest living former major league player.

See also
List of centenarians (Major League Baseball players)
List of centenarians (sportspeople)

References

External links

1900 births
2002 deaths
American centenarians
Men centenarians
Major League Baseball second basemen
Chicago White Sox players
Baseball players from Illinois
People from Mercer County, Illinois